Modinagar Assembly constituency is one of the 403 constituencies of the Uttar Pradesh Legislative Assembly, India. It is a part of the Ghaziabad district and one of the five assembly constituencies in the Baghpat Lok Sabha constituency. The first election in this assembly constituency was held in 1957 after the "DPACO (1956)" (delimitation order) was passed in 1956. After the "Delimitation of Parliamentary and Assembly Constituencies Order, 2008" was passed in 2008, the constituency was assigned identification number 57.

Wards / areas
Extent of Modinagar Assembly constituency is KCs Modinagar, Bhojpur, Modinagar MB, Faridnagar NP, Patla NP & Niwari NP of Modi Nagar Tehsil.

Members of the Legislative Assembly

Election results

2022

2017

16th Vidhan Sabha: 2012 General Elections.

See also
Baghpat Lok Sabha constituency
Ghaziabad district, India
Sixteenth Legislative Assembly of Uttar Pradesh
Uttar Pradesh Legislative Assembly

References

External links
 

Assembly constituencies of Uttar Pradesh
Modinagar
Constituencies established in 1956
1956 establishments in Uttar Pradesh